Thomas Stanley (1581–1669), of Hamptons, West Peckham and Earl's Place, Earl's Lane, Maidstone, Kent, was an English politician.

He was a Member (MP) of the Parliament of England for Maidstone in 1625.

References

1581 births
1669 deaths
English MPs 1625
Members of Parliament for Maidstone
People from West Peckham